"This Is Our God" is a song by American contemporary Christian musician Phil Wickham. The song was released on January 13, 2023, as the lead single from Wickham's upcoming studio album. Wickham co-wrote the song with Brandon Lake, Pat Barrett, and Steven Furtick. Jonathan Smith produced the single.

"This Is Our God" peaked at number 12 on the US Hot Christian Songs chart.

Background
On January 8, 2023, Phil Wickham announced that he will release "This Is Our God" on January 13 as the lead single previewing his upcoming studio album. On January 13, 2023, Phil Wickham released "This Is Our God." The single comes as Wickham had received GMA Dove Awards for Worship Recorded Song of the Year with "Hymn of Heaven," Worship Album of the Year with Hymn of Heaven (2021), and Songwriter of the Year (Artist) at the 2022 ceremony, as well as 2023 Grammy Award nominations for Best Contemporary Christian Music Performance/Song for "Hymn of Heaven" and co-writing Chris Tomlin's song, "Holy Forever." Wickham spoke of the song, saying "When we sing about our God, we sing about a God who loves without condition, who gives grace to the sinner, who saves the one who calls out, who pulls people out of the pit and brings them into His heavenly kingdom. This is our God. A God who saves, a God who redeems, a God who makes beauty from ashes and a God who renews. This is our manifesto. I cannot wait to sing this song with the church. This is our God."

Composition

Critical reception
Jonathan Andre, reviewing for 365 Days of Inspiring Media review, gave a positive remarks about the song, describing it as "something new and exciting, unique, powerful, and enjoyable," commending Wickham for making "such a powerful worship song."

Commercial performance
"This Is Our God" debuted at number 15 on the US Hot Christian Songs chart dated January 28, 2023, concurrently charting at 26 on the US Christian Airplay chart, and number 29 on the Digital Song Sales chart, dated January 28, 2023.

Music videos
Phil Wickham published the official music video for "This Is Our God" on January 13, 2023, as well as the song's lyric video, through YouTube.

Charts

Release history

References

External links
 
 
 

2023 songs
2023 singles
Contemporary Christian songs
Phil Wickham songs
Songs written by Phil Wickham
Songs written by Brandon Lake
Songs written by Steven Furtick